Autry DeWalt Mixon Jr. (June 14, 1931 – November 23, 1995), known professionally as Junior Walker, was an American multi-instrumentalist (primarily saxophonist) and vocalist who recorded for Motown during the 1960s. He also performed as a session and live-performing saxophonist with the band Foreigner during the 1980s.

Early life
Walker was born Autry DeWalt Mixon Jr. on June 14, 1931, in Blytheville, Arkansas, but grew up in South Bend, Indiana. He began playing saxophone while in high school, and his saxophone style was the anchor for the sound of the bands he later played in.

Career
His career started when he developed his own band in the mid-1950s as the Jumping Jacks. His longtime friend and drummer Billy Nicks (1935–2017) formed his own group, the Rhythm Rockers. Periodically, Nicks would sit in on Jumping Jack's shows, and Walker would sit in on the Rhythm Rockers shows.

Nicks obtained a permanent gig at a local TV station in South Bend, Indiana, and asked Walker to join him and keyboard player Fred Patton permanently. Nicks asked Willie Woods (1936–1997), a local singer, to perform with the group; Woods would learn how to play guitar. When Nicks was drafted into the United States Army, Walker convinced the band to move from South Bend to Battle Creek, Michigan. While performing in Benton Harbor, Walker found a drummer, Tony Washington, to replace Nicks. Eventually, Fred Patton left the group, and Victor Thomas stepped in. The original name, The Rhythm Rockers, was changed to "The All Stars." Walker's style was inspired by jump blues and early R&B, particularly players like Louis Jordan, Earl Bostic, and Illinois Jacquet.

The group was spotted by Johnny Bristol, and in 1961 he recommended them to Harvey Fuqua, who had his own record labels. Once the group started recording on the Harvey label, their name was changed to Jr. Walker All Stars. The name was modified again when Fuqua's labels were taken over by Motown's Berry Gordy, and Jr. Walker & the All Stars became members of the Motown family, recording for their Soul imprint in 1964.

The members of the band changed after the acquisition of the Harvey label. Tony Washington, the drummer, quit the group, and James Graves joined. Their first and signature hit was "Shotgun", written and composed by Walker and produced by Berry Gordy, which featured the Funk Brothers' James Jamerson on bass and Benny Benjamin on drums. "Shotgun" reached No. 4 on the Billboard Hot 100 and No. 1 on the R&B chart in 1965, and was followed by many other hits, such as "(I'm a) Road Runner", "Shake and Fingerpop" and remakes of two Motown songs "Come See About Me" and "How Sweet It Is (To Be Loved by You)", that had previously been hits for the Supremes and Marvin Gaye respectively. In 1966, Graves left and was replaced by old cohort Billy "Stix" Nicks, and Walker's hits continued apace with tunes such as "I'm a Road Runner" and "Pucker Up Buttercup".

In 1969, the group had another hit enter the top 5, "What Does It Take (To Win Your Love)". A Motown quality control meeting rejected this song for single release, but radio station DJs made the track popular, resulting in Motown releasing it as a single, whereupon it reached No. 4 on the Hot 100 and No. 1 on the R&B chart.  From that time on, Walker sang more on the records than earlier in their career. He landed several more R&B Top Ten hits over the next few years, with the last coming in 1972. He toured the UK in 1970 with drummer Jerome Teasley (Wilson Pickett), guitarist Phil Wright (brother of Betty "Clean Up Woman" Wright), keyboardist Sonny Holley (The Temptations) and the youthful Liverpool UK bassist Norm Bellis (Apple). The band played two venues on each of the 14 nights. The finale was at The Valbonne in London's West End. They were joined on stage by The Four Tops for an impromptu set. In 1979, Walker went solo, disbanding the All Stars, and was signed to Norman Whitfield's Whitfield Records label, but he was not as successful on his own as he had been with the All Stars in his Motown period.

Walker re-formed the All Stars in the 1980s. On April 11, 1981, Walker was the musical guest on the season finale of Saturday Night Live.  Foreigner's 1981 album 4 featured Walker's sax solo on "Urgent". He later recorded his own version of the song for the 1983 All Stars's album Blow the House Down. Walker's version was also featured in the 1985 Madonna film Desperately Seeking Susan. In 1983, Walker was re-signed with Motown. In the same year, he appeared as a part of the Motown 25 television special which aired on May 16, 1983.

In 1988, Walker played opposite Sam Moore as one-half of the fictional soul duo The Swanky Modes in the comedy Tapeheads. Several songs were recorded for the soundtrack, including "Bet Your Bottom Dollar" and "Ordinary Man", produced by ex-Blondie member Nigel Harrison.

Death
Walker died of cancer at the age of 64 in Battle Creek, Michigan, on November 23, 1995. He is buried in Oak Hill Cemetery in Battle Creek under a marker inscribed with both his birth name of Autry DeWalt Mixon Jr. and his stage name.

Awards and honors
Junior Walker & the All Stars received three Grammy Award nominations:

 "Shotgun" - Best Rhythm and Blues Recording (1965)
 "What Does It Take" - Best R&B Instrumental Performance (1969)
 "Wishing on a Star" - Best R&B Instrumental Performance (1979)

He was inducted into the Rhythm and Blues Foundation in 1995. Walker's "Shotgun" was inducted into the Grammy Hall of Fame in 2002. Jr. Walker & the All Stars were voted into the Michigan Rock and Roll Legends Hall of Fame in 2007.

Discography

Studio albums

Live albums

Compilation albums

Singles

See also
List of Motown Records artists
List of soul musicians
List of people from Arkansas

References

External links
History of Rock 'n' Roll entry
Jr. Walker & The All-Stars on the Soulwalking UK website

1931 births
1995 deaths
American male saxophonists
Deaths from cancer in Michigan
Motown artists
Singers from Arkansas
People from Blytheville, Arkansas
20th-century American saxophonists
20th-century African-American male singers
Soul-jazz saxophonists